The 2005 Hamilton Tiger-Cats season was the 48th season for the team in the Canadian Football League and their 56th overall. The Tiger-Cats finished in 4th place in the East Division with a 5–13 record and missed the playoffs.

Offseason

CFL Draft

Preseason

Regular season

Season standings

Season schedule

Awards and records

2005 CFL All-Stars
 Adriano Belli - DT

Eastern Division All-Star Selections
 Adriano Belli - DT

References

Hamilton Tiger-Cats seasons
Hamilton